The domestic yak (Bos grunniens), also known as the Tartary ox, grunting ox or hairy cattle, is a species of long-haired domesticated cattle found throughout the Himalayan region of the Indian subcontinent, the Tibetan Plateau, Kachin State (Northern Myanmar), Yunnan, Sichuan, Gilgit-Baltistan (Kashmir), and as far north as Mongolia and Siberia. It is descended from the wild yak (Bos mutus).

Etymology
In English, as in most other languages that have borrowed the word, "yak" is usually used for both sexes, with "bull" or "cow" referring to each sex separately.

Taxonomy

Belonging to the genus Bos, Yaks are related to cattle (Bos primigenius). Mitochondrial DNA analyses to determine the evolutionary history of yaks have been inconclusive.

The yak may have diverged from cattle at any point between one and five million years ago, and there is some suggestion that it may be more closely related to bison than to the other members of its designated genus. Apparent close fossil relatives of the yak, such as Bos baikalensis, have been found in eastern Russia, suggesting a possible route by which yak-like ancestors of the modern American bison could have entered the Americas.

The species was originally designated as Bos grunniens ("grunting ox") by Linnaeus in 1766, but this name is now generally considered to refer only to the domesticated form of the animal, with Bos mutus ("mute ox") being the preferred name for the wild species. Although some authors still consider the wild yak to be a subspecies, Bos grunniens mutus, the ICZN made an official ruling in 2003 permitting the use of the name Bos mutus for wild yaks, and this is now the more common usage.

Except where the wild yak is considered as a subspecies of Bos grunniens, there are no recognised subspecies of yak.

Physical characteristics

Yaks are heavily built animals with bulky frames, sturdy legs, rounded, cloven hooves, and extremely dense, long fur that hangs down lower than the belly. While wild yaks are generally dark, blackish to brown in colouration, domestic yaks can be quite variable in colour, often having patches of rusty brown and cream. They have small ears and wide foreheads, with smooth horns that are generally dark in colour. Both sexes have a short neck with a pronounced hump over the shoulders, although this is larger and more visible in males. Males weigh , females weigh .

Both sexes have long shaggy hair with a dense woolly undercoat over the chest, flanks, and thighs to insulate them from the cold. Especially in bulls, this may form a long "skirt" that can reach the ground. The tail is long and horselike rather than tufted like the tails of cattle or bison. Domesticated yaks have a wide range of coat colours, with some individuals being white, grey, brown, roan or piebald. The udder in females and the scrotum in males are small and hairy, as protection against the cold. Females have four teats.

Yaks are not known to produce the characteristic lowing (mooing) sound of cattle, but both wild and domestic yaks grunt and squeak, which inspired the scientific name of the domestic yak variant, Bos grunniens (grunting bull).  Nikolay Przhevalsky named the wild variant Bos mutus (silent bull) believing that it did not make a sound at all, but it does.

Physiology

Yak physiology is well adapted to high altitudes, having larger lungs and heart than cattle found at lower altitudes, as well as greater capacity for transporting oxygen through their blood, due to the persistence of foetal haemoglobin throughout life. Further adaptations to the cold include a thick layer of subcutaneous fat, and an almost complete lack of functional sweat glands.

Compared with domestic cattle, the rumen of yaks is unusually large, relative to the omasum. This likely allows them to consume greater quantities of low-quality food at a time, and to ferment it longer so as to extract more nutrients. Yak consume the equivalent of 1% of their body weight daily while cattle require 3% to maintain condition. They are grazing herbivores, with their wild ancestors feeding primarily on grass and sedges, with some herbs and dwarf shrubs.

Reproduction and life history

Yaks mate in the summer, typically between July and September, depending on the local environment. For the remainder of the year, many bulls wander in small bachelor groups away from the large herds, but, as the rut approaches, they become aggressive and regularly fight among each other to establish dominance. In addition to non-violent threat displays, bellowing, and scraping the ground with their horns, bull yaks also compete more directly, repeatedly charging at each other with heads lowered or sparring with their horns. Like bison, but unlike cattle, males wallow in dry soil during the rut, often while scent-marking with urine or dung. Females enter oestrus up to four times a year, and females are receptive only for a few hours in each cycle.

Gestation lasts between 257 and 270 days, so that the young are born between May and June, and results in the birth of a single calf. The cow finds a secluded spot to give birth, but the calf is able to walk within about ten minutes of birth, and the pair soon rejoin the herd. Females of both the wild and domestic forms typically give birth only once every other year, although more frequent births are possible if the food supply is good.

Calves are weaned at one year and become independent shortly thereafter. Wild calves are initially brown in color, and only later develop the darker adult hair. Females generally give birth for the first time at three or four years of age, and reach their peak reproductive fitness at around six years. Yaks may live for more than twenty years in domestication or captivity, although it is likely that this may be somewhat shorter in the wild.

Husbandry
Domesticated yaks have been kept for thousands of years, primarily for their milk, fibre and meat, and as beasts of burden. Their dried droppings are an important fuel, used all over Tibet, and are often the only fuel available on the high treeless Tibetan Plateau. Yaks transport goods across mountain passes for local farmers and traders and are an attraction for climbing and trekking expeditions: "Only one thing makes it hard to use yaks for long journeys in barren regions. They will not eat grain, which could be carried on the journey.  They will starve unless they can be brought to a place where there is grass." They also are used to draw ploughs. Yak's milk is often processed to a cheese called chhurpi in Tibetan and Nepali languages, and byaslag in Mongolia. Butter made from yaks' milk is an ingredient of the butter tea that Tibetans consume in large quantities, and is also used in lamps and made into butter sculptures used in religious festivities.

Outside the Himalayas
Small numbers of herds can be found in the United States and Canada, as well as New Zealand and some parts of Europe. Yaks have generated interest outside the Himalayas as a commercial crop and by cattle breeders. The main interest of North American yak breeders is lean meat production by "hybridizing" with other cattle, followed by yak fiber wool production.

Research
The Indian government established a dedicated centre for research into yak husbandry, the ICAR-National Research Centre on Yak, in 1989.

Yak breeding and hybridization
In Nepal, Tibet and Mongolia, domestic cattle are crossbred with yaks. The "Dwarf Lulu" breed, "the only Bos primigenius taurus type of cattle in Nepal" has been tested for DNA markers and found to be a mixture of both taurine and zebu types of cattle (B. p. taurus and B. p. indicus) with yak. According to the International Veterinary Information Service, the low productivity of second generation cattle-yak crosses makes them suitable only as meat animals.

Crosses between yaks and domestic cattle (Bos primigenius taurus) have been recorded in Chinese literature for at least 2,000 years. Successful crosses have also been recorded between yak and American bison, gaur, and banteng, generally with similar results to those produced with domestic cattle.

Linguistic evidence for yak domestication
Jacques et al. (2021) show that most elaborate yak-related terminologies are found within Tibetic and Gyalrongic languages. Both branches also have native terms for yak-cattle hybrids, suggesting that Tibetic and Gyalrongic speakers may have independently cross-bred yaks and cattle, predating the proto-Gyalrongic split (3221 [2169-4319] BP) from Tibeto-Gyalrongic.

Customs

Blood drinking festival
In Nepal, there is an annual festival held to drink fresh blood of yak in a belief that it cures varieties of disease such as gastritis, jaundice and body sprain. The fresh blood is extracted from the neck of a yak without killing it. The cut is healed after the ceremony is over. The ritual is  believed to be originated in Tibet and Mustang.

Yak sports
In parts of Tibet and Karakorum, yak racing is a form of entertainment at traditional festivals and is considered an important part of their culture. More recently, sports involving domesticated yaks, such as yak skiing or yak polo, are being marketed as tourist attractions in South Asian countries, including in Gilgit-Baltistan, Pakistan.

Gallery

See also
 Yakalo

References

External links

International Yak Association (IYAK)
European Yak Association (EYAK)
Article on Yak breeds in FAO archives
Yaks: The Official Animal of Tibet
Yak Genome Database

 
Livestock
Domesticated animals
Pack animals
Mammals of Central Asia
Mammals of East Asia
Mammals of Siberia
Mammals of South Asia
Mammals of Tibet
Fauna of the Himalayas
Mammals described in 1766
Taxa named by Carl Linnaeus